Minuscule 457 (in the Gregory-Aland numbering), α 67 (in the Soden numbering), is a Greek minuscule manuscript of the New Testament, on parchment. Palaeographically it has been assigned to the 10th century. The manuscript has complex contents. 
Formerly it was labeled by 87a and 97p.

Description 

The codex contains the text of the Acts of the Apostles, Catholic epistles, and Pauline epistles on 294 parchment leaves. It is written in one column per page, in 19 lines per page.

The order of books: Acts of the Apostles, Catholic epistles, and Pauline epistles.

Text 

The Greek text of the codex is a representative of the Byzantine text-type. Aland placed it in Category V.

History 

The manuscript was examined and slightly collated by Birch and Scholz. Antonio Maria Biscioni published its facsimile in 1752.

Formerly it was labeled by 87a and 97p. C. R. Gregory saw it in 1886. In 1908 Gregory gave number 457 to it.

It is currently housed at the Laurentian Library (Plutei IV. 29) in Florence.

See also 

 List of New Testament minuscules
 Biblical manuscript
 Textual criticism

References

Further reading 

 Antonio Maria Biscioni, Bibliothecae Mediceo-Laurentianae catalogus, Florence 1752, vol. 2, pp. 66–70.

External links 
 

Greek New Testament minuscules
10th-century biblical manuscripts